Red Orchids is a 1938 German crime film directed by Nunzio Malasomma and starring Olga Tschechowa, Albrecht Schoenhals and Camilla Horn.

Cast

References

Bibliography

External links 
 

1938 films
1930s spy thriller films
German spy thriller films
1930s German-language films
Films directed by Nunzio Malasomma
Films of Nazi Germany
Films set in Europe
German black-and-white films
1930s German films